Zane Warren King is an Australian former swimmer of the 1990s who competed in medley events.

King, a swimmer from Galston on the outskirts of Sydney, trained at the Australian Institute of Sport in Canberra.

In 1997, King came sixth in the 200m individual medley at the FINA Short Course World Championships and competed at the Pan Pacific Championships in Fukuoka, where he won the B final of the 200m individual medley.

King, a national champion in the 400 m individual medley, was a bronze medalist in that event at the Kuala Lumpur Commonwealth Games in 1998 and also represented Australia at that year's FINA World Championships in Perth.

His wife Rebecca Brown is a former Olympic swimmer.

References

External links

Year of birth missing (living people)
Living people
Australian male butterfly swimmers
Swimmers from Sydney
Australian Institute of Sport swimmers
Commonwealth Games bronze medallists for Australia
Commonwealth Games medallists in swimming
Medallists at the 1998 Commonwealth Games
Swimmers at the 1998 Commonwealth Games
Australian male medley swimmers